Baniyani   (Nepali: बनियानी)  is a Village Development Committee in Jhapa District in the Province No. 1 of south-eastern Nepal. At the time of the 1991 Nepal census it had a population of 5043 people residing in 985 individual households. Laxmi Higher Secondary School, Baniyani Health-Post, and an Armed-Force Camp are located in the vicinity. Mechi River flows to the east on the border of Nepal and India.

Demographics
Many ethnic groups live in the region, such as: Rai, Newar, Tamang, Limbu, Meche, Koche, Rajbanshi, Gangain, Muslim, and Gaine.

References

Populated places in Jhapa District